Conus trencarti is a species of sea snail, a marine gastropod mollusc in the family Conidae, the cone snails and their allies.

Like all species within the genus Conus, these snails are predatory and venomous. They are capable of "stinging" humans, therefore live ones should be handled carefully or not at all.

Description
The size of the shell varies between 20 mm and 27 mm.

Distribution
This species occurs in the Atlantic Ocean off Senegal.

References

 Nolf, F.; Verstraeten, J. (2008). Conus trencarti (Mollusca: Gastropoda: Conidae): a new cone from Senegal. Neptunea 7(4): 1–12.

External links
 The Conus Biodiversity website
 Cone Shells – Knights of the Sea
 
 Holotype in MNHN, Paris

trencarti
Gastropods described in 2008